Pi  (uppercase Π, lowercase π and ϖ) is the sixteenth letter of the Greek alphabet, representing the voiceless bilabial plosive .  In the system of Greek numerals it has a value of 80. It was derived from the Phoenician letter Pe. Letters that arose from pi include Latin P, Cyrillic Pe (П, п), Coptic pi (Ⲡ, ⲡ), and Gothic pairthra (𐍀).

Uppercase Pi 
The uppercase letter Π is used as a symbol for:
 In textual criticism, Codex Petropolitanus, a 9th-century uncial codex of the Gospels, now located in St. Petersburg, Russia.
 In legal shorthand, it represents a plaintiff.

In science and engineering:
 The product operator in mathematics, indicated with capital pi notation  (in analogy to the use of the capital Sigma  as summation symbol).
 The osmotic pressure in chemistry.
 The viscous stress tensor in continuum mechanics and fluid dynamics.

Lowercase Pi 
The lowercase letter π is used as a symbol for:
 The mathematical real transcendental (and thus irrational) constant π ≈ 3.14159..., the ratio of a circle's circumference to its diameter in Euclidean geometry. The letter "π" is the first letter of the Greek words  'periphery' and  'perimeter', i.e. the circumference.
 The prime-counting function in mathematics.
 Homotopy groups  in algebraic topology.
 Dimensionless parameters constructed using the Buckingham π theorem of dimensional analysis.
 The hadron called the pion (pi meson).
 Economic profit in microeconomics.
 Inflation rate in macroeconomics.
 A type of chemical bond in which the p orbitals overlap, called a pi bond.
 The natural projection on the tangent bundle on a manifold.
 The unary operation of projection in relational algebra.
 Policy in reinforcement learning.

 Polyamory (in the earliest polyamory pride flag design, created by Jim Evans in 1995, pi stands for the first letter of polyamory).

History

Variant pi 

Variant pi or "pomega" ( or ϖ) is a glyph variant of lowercase pi sometimes used in technical contexts. It resembles a lowercase omega with a macron, though historically it is simply a cursive form of pi, with its legs bent inward to meet. It was also used in the minuscule script. It is a symbol for:
 Angular frequency of a wave in fluid dynamics (angular frequency is usually represented by  but this may be confused with vorticity in a fluid dynamics context).
 Longitude of pericenter in celestial mechanics.
 Comoving distance in cosmology.
 Single-scattering albedo in radiative transfer.
 Mean fitness of a population in biology.
 Fundamental weights of a representation (probably to better distinguish from elements  of the Weyl group, than the usual notation ).
 The lemniscate constant.

Character encodings 
The various forms of pi are present in Unicode as:
 
 
 
 
 
 
 .

Character encodings tables
 Greek / Coptic Pi

 Mathematical Pi

The character encodings in the tables above are intended for use as mathematical symbols. Text written in the Greek language (i.e. words, as opposed to mathematics) should not come from any of the tables on this page, but instead should use the normal Greek letters, which have different code numbers and often a different appearance. Using the mathematical symbols to display words (or vice versa) is likely to result in inconsistent spacing and a clumsy, mismatched appearance.

See also 

 П, п – Pe (Cyrillic)
 P, p – Pe (Latin)
 Greek letters used in mathematics, science, and engineering#Ππ (pi)
Tau

References 

Greek letters